Övündüler is a village in the Bağlar District of Diyarbakır Province in Turkey.

References

Villages in Bağlar District